Following are the results of the 2008 Copa Aerosur, the Bolivian football tournament held in La Paz, Cochabamba and Santa Cruz, sponsored by AeroSur airline.

In this edition teams from 2nd and 3rd division participate, but for them instead of winning free passage on Aerosur to travel to play their games during 2008, they will receive $10000 and the runner-up $5000.

For LPFB team the Copa Aerosur champion will have free passage on Aerosur to travel to play their games during the 2008 season of the Bolivian Professional Football League, while the runner will have a 75% discount. The other participants may access the 50% discount on tickets if they agree to bring the airline's logo on his uniform.

The 2008 version of the cup has three novelties: [1] defined by shootout in case of ties in all instances of the tournament, the implementation of a tournament U-18 parallel to the official tournament, and a recoil to be played between the champion Aerosur Cup, the champion of the Copa Aerosur del Sur and two foreign clubs.

1st qualifying round

|}

2nd qualifying round

|}

3rd qualifying round

|}

Bracket

Quarter-final

|}

Second Leg

Semi-final

|}

Final

2008 domestic association football cups
2008
2008 in Bolivian football